Meljac is a commune in the Aveyron department in southern France.

Geography
The river Céor forms all of the commune's northern border.

Population

See also
Communes of the Aveyron department

References

Communes of Aveyron
Aveyron communes articles needing translation from French Wikipedia